Wu Kin San (born May 4, 1985 in Hong Kong) is a Hong Kong professional road cyclist, who last rode for the  team.

Professional career
Wu began cycling at the age of twelve, and having shown his great talent and passion for sport, turned pro just 8 years later. In 2005, he claimed numerous titles road race at the Tour of South China Sea in Macau and Hong Kong, while playing for Purapharm Cycling Team. Following his return to Hong Kong, Wu supposedly started his first race for the Tour of Qinghai Lake, but  decided to withdraw from the tour. Few months later, his contract with the Italian pro cycling firm ended.

In 2007, Wu started his season with the Hong Kong Pro Cycling Team by winning his first ever national Under-23 championship title in 2 hours, 10 minutes, and 16 seconds. A year later, Wu switched his focus to the 2008 Summer Olympics in Beijing, where he finished the men's road race in 88th place with a time of 7:05:57. Wu also became the first ever cyclist from Hong Kong to successfully complete the Olympic road race.

Career highlights

2005
 1st Stage 6 Tour d'Indonesia, Malang (INA)
 1st Overall Tour of South China Sea
 1st Stages 1, 3 & 8
2006
 1st Stage 1 Tour of Siam, Saphan Hin (THA)
2007
 1st National Road Race Championships
 1st National Under-23 Road Race Championships
2008
 3rd Overall Cepa Tour
2009
 4th Hong Kong Criterium Series
2010
 4th National Road Race Championships
 1st Stage 2 Hong Kong Road Race
 2nd Hong Kong Criterium Series
 10th Tour of South China Sea
2012
 4th National Road Race Championships

References

External links
NBC 2008 Olympics profile
Player Bio – Champion System

1985 births
Living people
Hong Kong male cyclists
Cyclists at the 2008 Summer Olympics
Olympic cyclists of Hong Kong
Cyclists at the 2006 Asian Games
Asian Games competitors for Hong Kong